Georgia State Route 3 Connector may refer to:

 Georgia State Route 3 Connector (Albany): A former connector that traveled in Albany
 Georgia State Route 3 Connector (Atlanta): A connector that travels in Atlanta
 Georgia State Route 3 Connector (Clayton County): An unsigned connector that travels in Clayton County
 Georgia State Route 3 Connector (Marietta 1965–1985): A former connector that traveled in Marietta
 Georgia State Route 3 Connector (Marietta): A connector that travels in Marietta
 Georgia State Route 3 Connector (Whitfield County): A connector that travels in Whitfield County

003 Connector